Visa requirements for Sudanese citizens are administrative entry restrictions by the authorities of other states placed on citizens of Sudan. As of 2 July 2019, Sudanese citizens had visa-free or visa on arrival access to 37 countries and territories, ranking the Sudanese passport 103rd in terms of travel freedom according to the Henley Passport Index.
Visa not required for Egypt and Lebanon

Visa requirements map

Visa requirements

Dependent, Disputed, or Restricted territories
Unrecognized or partially recognized countries

Dependent and autonomous territories

See also

 Visa policy of Sudan
 Sudanese passport
 List of nationalities forbidden at border

References and Notes
References

Notes

Sudan
Government of Sudan